The Guggenheim International Award was established in 1956 as "both a recognition of outstanding achievements in the visual arts and an important manifestation of international goodwill".  A shortlist of artists and works were selected by juries to represent different countries, with one overall winner selected by the Solomon R. Guggenheim Foundation and awarded a monetary prize of US$10,000, then the largest art prize awarded in the US.  Prizes were given every two years from 1956 to 1964 (omitting 1962).  The award was discontinued after 1964 in order to divert funds to acquiring further artwork for the Foundation.

Winners

See also
 Guggenheim Fellowship

References

Weblinks
Document 1960 at archive.org

Visual arts awards
Solomon R. Guggenheim Foundation